The Ciclo Cross de Iraeta is a cyclo-cross race held in Iraeta, Spain, which was held for the first time in 2007.

Past winners

References
 Results

Cycle races in the Basque Country
Cyclo-cross races
Recurring sporting events established in 2007
2007 establishments in Spain
Sport in Gipuzkoa